Ujjwal Nagar is a metro station on the Orange Line of the Nagpur Metro serving the Manish Nagar, Besa, and Beltarodi areas of Nagpur. It was opened on 6 April 2021. It is also known as Somalwada Metro Station.

The Metro Station has two entries and exits, the east one opens near Bajaj Motors, while the West one opens near Kabit Kinder Garden.

The station covers an area of 8,800 square meters.

Accessibility and Connectivity 
Ujjwal Nagar Metro station serves are a good stop for nearby areas like Manish Nagar, Besa & Beltrodi.

Getting as autoriksha is more easy from east exit of metro station, near Bajaj Motors.

Station Layout

References 

Nagpur Metro stations
Railway stations in India opened in 2021